Quinta Vendrell, in Adjuntas, Puerto Rico, is believed to have been designed by architect Alfredo B. Wiechers Pieretti.  It is a two-story balloon framed country house that was built in 1918.  It was listed on the U.S. National Register of Historic Places in 2006.

The home sustained damages as a result of Hurricane María on September 20, 2017, and in 2019, the owners were in talks with community representatives about how to raise funds to repair it.

References

Houses on the National Register of Historic Places in Puerto Rico
Houses completed in 1918
Adjuntas, Puerto Rico
Victorian architecture in the United States
1918 establishments in Puerto Rico